Mesut Ünal (born 3 April 1973) is a Turkish former footballer who played as a centre-back, best known for his Süper Lig stints with Bursaspor and Sakaryaspor.

Club career
A youth product of Bursaspor, Ünal made his professional debut with Bursaspor in a 1–0 Süper Lig loss to Zeytinburnuspor on 14 November 1993. He had several spells with Bursaspor throughout his career, and also spent time with Sakaryaspor.

International career
Ünal made one appearance with the Turkey U21s in a 1996 UEFA European Under-21 Championship 2-0 qualification win over Switzerland U21 on 24 April 1995.

Personal life
Mesut's son, Enes Ünal, is also a professional footballer and international for Turkey.

References

External links
 
 

1973 births
Living people
Footballers from Istanbul
Turkish footballers
Association football central defenders
Turkey youth international footballers
Süper Lig players
TFF First League players
TFF Second League players
Bursaspor footballers
Sakaryaspor footballers
Altay S.K. footballers
Balıkesirspor footballers